According to the report submitted by the former Foreign Minister Khawaja Muhammad Asif former Prime minister Nawaz Sharif made more than 65 international trips in his third premiership between June 2013 and February 2016.   Since his tenure ended on 28 July 2017, the exact number of trips made during his tenure are not officially available. According to another report submitted to the federal cabinet Nawaz Sharif spent 262 days abroad during his tenure.  Between June 2013 and February 2016 he made 10 foreign trips in 2013, 11 in 2014, 23 in 2015, and 9 each in 2016 and 2017.

Summary of international trips

According to Khawaja Asif's report, the foreign visits cost the national exchequer more than Rs 1 billion for visits between June 2013 and February 2016. These visits accompanied 631 officers with him.  According to another report submitted to the federal cabinet Nawaz Sharif spent 262 days abroad during his tenure. Among the money spent Rs. 30m is spent on tips and Rs. 60m on gifts. The report revealed that a total of Rs 1.84bn was spent on foreign trips by the former prime minister.    

The lavish spending in foreign trips are criticised by neutral observers of international media.   
In May, 2016 the Lahore High Court took notice of lavish spending in foreign tours on public money. The court asked to explain 17 visits to Britain with two months spent in the U.K. The court also questioned how days listed as transit closed 137.8 million rupees.  
 

The exact figures for his trips during his tenure are not available officially. The number of visits per country where he travelled between June 2013 and February 2016  are:
 1 visit to Afghanistan.
 1 visit to Germany.
 1 visit to Bahrain
 1 visit to India.
 1 visit to Iran.
 1 visit to Nepal.
 1 visit to Tajikistan.
 1 visit to Thailand.
 2 visits to Uzbekistan.
 2 visits to Kazakhstan.
 4 visits to China.
 4 visits to Turkey.
 4 visits to the United States.
 5 visits to Saudi Arabia.
 17 visits to the United Kingdom.

2013

2014

2015

See also 
 Foreign relations of Pakistan

References

Nawaz Sharif
Foreign relations of Pakistan
Sharif, Nawaz